Legrand Affair is the third solo recording from singer and actress, Melissa Errico was produced by Phil Ramone, and co-produced by Richard Jay-Alexander. Released 18 October 2011, the album was distributed through Sh-K-Boom records.

Track listing

References

2011 albums